The Three Heroes and Five Gallants (三俠五義) is a slightly different version of the 19th-century Chinese novel The Seven Heroes and Five Gallants.

The Three Heroes and Five Gallants may also refer to:
 The Three Heroes and Five Gallants (1991 TV series) (三俠五義), a 1991 Chinese TV series.
 The Three Heroes and Five Gallants (2016 TV series) (五鼠鬧東京), a 2016 Chinese TV series

See also
The Seven Heroes and Five Gallants (disambiguation)
Justice Bao (disambiguation)
Wu Shu Nao Dong Jing (disambiguation)

The Seven Heroes and Five Gallants